W. W. Griffin Farm is a historic home and farm located near Williamston, Martin County, North Carolina. The house was built about 1902, and built as a two-story, three bay, frame, I-house.  It is sheathed in weatherboard siding and rests on a brick pier foundation.  The house has a stylish front porch, one-story rear ell, and an additional room added about 1930.  Also on the property is the contributing storage shed (c. 1920), corn crib (c. 1900), cotton barn (c. 1910), hay barn (c. 1940), brick well (c. 1930), and agricultural landscape.

It was added to the National Register of Historic Places in 2001.

References

Farms on the National Register of Historic Places in North Carolina
Houses completed in 1902
Buildings and structures in Martin County, North Carolina
National Register of Historic Places in Martin County, North Carolina